S. oculatus may refer to:

Sciurus oculatus, the Peters's squirrel, a tree squirrel species
Scombrops oculatus, a fish species

Synonyms
Sphagebranchus oculatus, a synonym of Dalophis imberbis, the armless snake eel, an eel species
Squalus oculatus, a synonym of Hemiscyllium ocellatum, the epaulette shark, a shark species